Leviathan is a fictional criminal organization in DC Comics, later revealed to be a schism of the League of Assassins under the leadership of Talia al Ghul, the daughter of Ra's al Ghul.

The organization appears in a different form in the fourth season finale and fifth season of Supergirl.

Publication history
Leviathan was introduced in Batman: The Return (Jan. 2011) and was created by Grant Morrison and David Finch.

Fictional team history

First incarnation
Leviathan is an organization founded by Talia al Ghul upon leaving her father, Ra's al Ghul's League of Assassins. Leviathan's liturgy is staunchly anti-capitalist and seeks to dismantle society and impose itself as the leader of a new way.

Leviathan first became known to the heroes of Earth as a terror group who kidnapped the child of a Yemeni sheik. However, Batman discovered that Leviathan was working with the sheik and was planning to attack the world with mind-controlled children and engineered metahumans.

Batman immediately connected the organization to an apocalyptic vision he had received while coming back from the dead and positioned his Batman Incorporated organization to oppose them. After some moves, Leviathan seemed to form up behind Doctor Dedalus, a Nazi master spy imprisoned on the Falkland Islands, with a predicted lifespan of months due to Alzheimers. In the aftermath of Dedalus' breakout, further investigation revealed that a paper trail showed a flow of child soldiers from training camps in the central African republic of Mtamba to locations around the world for use by Leviathan in their campaign.

In Batman Incorporated's struggle against Doctor Dedalus' master plan, they struck and hit empty locations which were in fact pre-prepared traps by Leviathan. Recovering, they realized that Dedalus was a feint, designed to make them show their hand on the eve of the war. Via a telephone, the leader of Leviathan, Talia al Ghul, spoke from her new headquarters opposite the cinema on Crime Alley. Talia stated Leviathan's goal was war with Batman's followers and the destruction of civilization.

Talia took control of the League of Assassins and added its agents to the plan. The plan began by seeding mind-control chemicals in the Gotham food supply through the "Dark Tower" fast-food chain while taking control of the Brothers Grimm Syndicate, which controlled the club on Gotham's West Side. Using a combination of agents in the school system, the police, and the civil service, Leviathan worked to control Gotham's children.

Talia soon tells Batman that her creation of Leviathan has been all out of spite. As revenge for denying her his love and unwavering dedication to his crusade for justice, Talia created Leviathan as an expressed antithesis of Batman Incorporated. The Heretic is eventually shown to be the eponymous "Leviathan" of the organization, the "Third Batman" that is prophesied to send Gotham into chaos and destroy it. However, the Heretic continuously fails Talia and proves himself to be just as defiant as his genetic template, the then-deceased Damian Wayne. After killing the Heretic, Talia attempts to activate a "death ring" around the planet, established by worldwide Leviathan agents. Batman Incorporated disables the weapon, and Talia is killed by Kathy Kane. Their leader dead, the intelligence agency known as Spyral (another organization Doctor Dedalus was involved with) took over Leviathan's resources, and the organization presumably collapsed in the wake of their defeat.

Second incarnation
In the wake of DC Rebirth, Leviathan had been revamped to be the creation of Doctor Dedalus alongside the Spyral covert agency to act as its counterpart. Professor Netz knew after the second world war, that the only real enemy of mankind would be man himself and upon the somber realization that he would not live forever. Opted to fabricate the twin clandestine operations, each one working the specified fields aligned with their own moral factors and professions; his way of ensuring his own immortality even after succumbing to Alzheimer's. Sometime after he faded into the shadows as Spyral's mysterious director. The daughter of infamous international ecoterrorist Ra's Al Ghul, Talia Al Ghul, would come to commandeer the Leviathan organization for her own purposes, having boasted of creating the pan-global cartel all her own. 

This "Underlife" as its retainers came to call it, was set and poised to circumvent the "Age of Heroes" and eventually overtake societal infrastructure as the new world order.

Before taking up the reigns, Talia would headhunt viable agents & operators from both her fathers League of Shadows as well as from the criminal underground in order to recast it in her image. One such indoctrinate, originally set to be League of Assassins, was a young metahuman child plucked from St. Hadrian's Finishing School for Girls, a cover for studying and ascertaining the aptitude for young trainees honed to be passed along amongst any of the top tier hidden orders of the world. 

Said youth would be taken in and tutored under the Demon's daughter, trained to hone her odd sound canceling powers in conjunction with some of the most cutting edge equipment, munitions & weapons tech money could buy, as the two worked together as they set out to build up the dream and ultimate ideal of the Demon's Daughter. Some decades prior to its fall into disarray, Talia would promise her most trusted assassin to be freed of the underlife which Leviathan controls one day, but would maintain her word to enforce her orders creed and edicts until then. About five years later, as if to make good on said arrangement, Talia ordered the page she took on to kill one of Leviathan's underbosses who'd intended to reveal the existence of her organization to the U.S. authorities because she wouldn't let him leave. Trust inside the criminal network was shattered, whence after Talia died and had been resurrected, she was ousted from her position as leader of Leviathan. The organization then fractured into various factions, guided by competing leaders.

Talia is taken to a Lazarus Pit in Khadym by those loyal to her and is resurrected from the dead. Talia would again regain control of the crime society after revealing to all the leftover remnants tied to Leviathan she'd staged this whole civil war for the sake of thinning and reinforcing its clientele due to their inherent greedy & belligerent nature having debilitated it before. She would then consolidate her command both by taking her favorite killer back into the fold against her will, before murdering and having them resurrected within the Lazarus Pit to make sure she retains their uncompromised loyalties. 

Things don't necessarily get back on track for the secret order, as the system is steadily being dismantled from within just as soon as its original leader resumes power. Many amongst its operative numbers have gone into hiding, causing the whole of the underlife to implode on itself with Leviathan steadily grinding down on top of it as a result.

Another incarnation of Leviathan appeared in the pages of "Event Leviathan". The new and improved organization has even taken over the facilities of Project Cadmus as Batgirl discovered.

Mark Shaw eventually acquired control of the organization and offered Talia a partnership alongside him. She instead decided to kidnap Clark Kent so Superman will come after them and help take the organization down. Shaw however had already been aware of her plan and freed him from the Kryptonite studded harness wrapped around his torso. Firestorm and Dex-Starr later attack Leviathan soldiers after freeing him with Lois Lane and Jimmy Olsen. Shaw later threw Talia out from his ship for trying to go against him, but Superman rescued her even though he nor the other heroes couldn't discover the new leader's identity.

Shaw then proceeded to take out all the other shadow organizations such as the D.E.O., A.R.G.U.S., Checkmate, and Spyral. While many assumed he had killed the agents of the organizations, in actuality many had been brainwashed or persuaded into joining Leviathan while this new order began appropriated their technology. They also nearly assassinated General Sam Lane and Amanda Waller after they refused to join but their actions caused a team of detectives and Lois to go after him.

After Superman confronted them in Cuba while tracking Waller, his offensive was stymied by a space-time energy cascade which stopped him dead in his tracks. Lois organized another team to go after their mystery man. Leviathan meanwhile had Superman transported to their location in Chicago and tried to convince him to join him, revealing how Spyral had developed technology to take his son Jon down and promised to fix the "broken world". Shaw then revealed that he took out the spy organizations to end all secrecy and revealed his true identity to him. He also promises to end all secrecy by exposing all secrets of the world's governments.

Membership
 Mark Shaw - new head of Leviathan, formally Manhunter.
 Talia al Ghul - former head of Leviathan. 
 Professor Pyg - Lazlo Valentin at first appears to be working for Simon Hurt, but it is later revealed that he is actually working for Talia al Ghul. He is incarcerated in Arkham Asylum after being captured by Batman (Dick Grayson) and Robin (Damian Wayne) in the first volume of Batman and Robin.
 The Heretic (Fatherless) - mysterious agent of Leviathan in a bat-like costume. The Heretic is a clone of Damian Wayne, first seen as a fetus in the first volume of Batman and Robin, whose growth has been accelerated to adulthood by way of a bio-engineered whale carcass. After killing Damian Wayne, the Heretic is defeated (but not killed) by Batman when he is run through with a sword. He is then finished off when Talia al Ghul kills him and blows up his body along with Wayne Tower.
 Son of Pyg - Son of Professor Pyg, real name Janosz Valentin a.k.a. Johnny Valentine. He is later defeated by Batgirl (Stephanie Brown) during a plot to turn a group of teen mercenaries-in-training into agents of Leviathan.
 Dr. Dedalus (Otto Netz) - former Nazi scientist, secret founder of both Leviathan & Spyral, and the biological father of Kathy Kane, the original Batwoman. He is later killed by the new Robin using a concealed knife.
 Goatboy - Gotham City-bred taxi driver-turned-assassin in light of Talia's billion dollar bounty on Damian. He is later killed by Lumina Lux.
 The Silencer - honor guest was Talia Al Ghul's best cleaner in the underlife, but she left her service behind pursuing normalcy as a housewife.
 Quietus - Leviathan underboss. Specializes in biomechanical physiology modifications and heads the technologies department.
 Wishbone - ran the magical division of Leviathan.
 Gunn - a Leviathan underboss. He's killed while fighting Quietus and Silencer in Khadym.
 Jonah 9 - a Leviathan underboss and the head of their eugenics and genetics division.
 Mad Dog - bounty hunter
 Raze - Leviathan super killer begotten of a eugenics experiment using Ra's hereditary code only to be taken in & indoctrinated by Talia much like Silencer was. He is killed by one of his test tube siblings, Smoke.
 Rutger Orestes - a Leviathan underboss that was murdered.

In other media
 Leviathan appears in Supergirl, initially led by Rama Khan before Gamemnae took over, as well as Tezumak, and Sela, and consisting of Margot Morrison (portrayed by Patti Allan), an unnamed elderly human man (portrayed by Duncan Fraser), Eve Teschmacher, Breathtaker, Rip Roar, and Andrea Rojas / Acrata. This version of the group is a secret organization and alliance of aliens from Jarhanpur, Krypton's sister planet, and humans who seek to manipulate human society, typically through advanced Jarhanpuran technology and cosmetic modification, and run a front company called Obsidian Tech, through which they collaborate with Lex Luthor and LuthorCorp to create the Obsidian Platinum virtual reality system.
 Leviathan appears in Catwoman: Hunted, secretly led by Talia al Ghul, with the Cheetah as a figurehead, and consisting of Tobias Whale, Mr. Yakuza, Dr. Tzin Zaho Tzin, La Dama, Moxie Mannheim, and Black Mask. This version of the group is a global crime syndicate with ties to Japanese, Chinese, and Central American cartels as well as Intergang.

References

Characters created by Grant Morrison
Comics characters introduced in 2011
Fictional organized crime groups